Kontrewers may refer to the following places:
Kontrewers, Łódź Voivodeship (central Poland)
Kontrewers, Masovian Voivodeship (east-central Poland)
Kontrewers, Świętokrzyskie Voivodeship (south-central Poland)